The men's 3000 metres steeplechase at the 2002 European Athletics Championships were held at the Olympic Stadium on August 7–10.

Medalists

Results

Heats
Qualification: First 4 of each heat (Q) and the next 3 fastest (q) qualified for the final.

Final

External links

3000
Steeplechase at the European Athletics Championships